Chandler is a unisex given name, usually applied to males, and likely derived from surnames reflecting the occupational term chandlery.

Notable people with the given name "Chandler" include

A
Chandler P. Anderson (1866–1936), American politician

B
Chandler Beach (1839–1928), American entrepreneur
Chandler Brewer (born 1997), American football player
Chandler McCuskey Brooks (1905–1989), American physiologist
Chandler Brossard (1922–1993), American novelist
Chandler Burr (born 1963), American journalist and author

C
Chandler Canterbury (born 1998), American child actor
Chandler Champion, American beauty pageant contestant
Chandler C. Cohagen (1889–1985), American architect
Chandler Coventry (1924–1999), Australian art collector
Chandler Cowles (1917–1997), American actor
Chandler Cox (born 1996), American football player

D
Chandler Davidson (1936–2021), American political scientist
Chandler Davis (1926–2022), American-Canadian mathematician

E
Chandler Egan (1884–1936), American golfer

F
Chandler Fenner (born 1990), American football player

G
Chandler González (born 1973), Cuban footballer

H
Chandler Hale (1873–1951), American diplomat
Chandler Harper (1914–2004), American golfer
Chandler C. Harvey (1866–1940), American publisher
Chandler Hoffman (born 1990), American soccer player
Chandler Huntington (1849–1921), American politician
Chandler Hutchison (born 1996), American basketball player

J
Chandler W. Johnson (1905–1945), American soldier
Chandler Jones (born 1990), American football player

L
Chandler Lawson (born 1990), American beauty pageant contestant

M
Chandler Massey (born 1990), American actor
Chandler McDaniel (born 1998), Filipino footballer
Chandler Moore (born 1995), American singer-songwriter

O
Chandler O'Dwyer (born 1999), English footballer
Chandler Owen (1889–1967), American activist
Chandler David Owens Sr. (1931–2011), American minister

P
Chandler Park, American physician
Chandler Parsons (born 1988), American basketball player
Chandler Rathfon Post (1881–1959), American professor

Q
Chandler Quarles (born 1990), American musician

R
Chandler Riggs (born 1999), American actor
Chandler Robbins (1918–2017), American ornithologist

S
Chandler Shepherd (born 1992), American baseball player
Chandler Smith (born 2002), American stock car racing driver
Chandler Sprague (??–1955), American screenwriter
Chandler Stephenson (born 1994), Canadian ice hockey player
Chandler Sterling (1911–1984), American bishop
Chandler Swope (born 1942), American politician

T
Chandler Thornton, American political operative
Chandler Travis (born 1950), American musician
Chandler Tuttle, American writer

V
Chandler Vaudrin (born 1997), American basketball player
Chandler Vaughn (born 2000), American soccer player

W
Chandler J. Wells (1814–1887), American politician
Chandler Williams (1985–2013), American football player
Chandler Woodcock, American politician
Chandler Wooten (born 1999), American football player
Chandler Worthy (born 1993), American football player

Fictional characters 
Chandler Bing, a character on the television series Friends

See also
Chandler (surname), a page for people with the surname "Chandler"
Chandler (disambiguation), a disambiguation page for "Chandler"

Masculine given names